is a micro-asteroid, classified as near-Earth object of the Aten group.

NASA estimated its size to be 12 metres in diameter with a mass of around 2500 tonnes.

See also 
 , another asteroid that passed Earth the same day
 List of asteroid close approaches to Earth

References

External links 
 
 
 
 

Minor planet object articles (unnumbered)
20100908
Discoveries by MLS
20100905